Carmem Sousa de Oliveira Furtado (born 17 August 1965) is a retired Brazilian long-distance runner.

She finished eleventh in the 10,000 metres at the 1993 World Championships in a new South American record time of 31:47.76 minutes. She also holds the South American record in 5000 metres with 15:22.01 minutes and in the marathon with 2:27:41 hours from the 1994 Boston Marathon. She also won the 15 km (Saint Silvester Road Race in São Paulo) in 1995.

Oliveira also has two cross country titles to her name, having won the South American Cross Country Championships in 1992 and 1994.

Achievements

References

External links

1965 births
Living people
Brazilian female long-distance runners
Athletes (track and field) at the 1987 Pan American Games
Athletes (track and field) at the 1991 Pan American Games
Athletes (track and field) at the 1995 Pan American Games
Athletes (track and field) at the 1992 Summer Olympics
Athletes (track and field) at the 1996 Summer Olympics
Olympic athletes of Brazil
Pan American Games gold medalists for Brazil
Pan American Games medalists in athletics (track and field)
Medalists at the 1991 Pan American Games
Medalists at the 1995 Pan American Games
21st-century Brazilian women
20th-century Brazilian women